The 1988 Fernleaf Classic was a women's tennis tournament played on outdoor hard courts in Wellington in New Zealand and was part of the Category 1 tier of the 1988 WTA Tour. The tournament ran from 1 February through 8 February 1988. The singles title was won by 13th seeded Jill Hetherington.

Finals

Singles

 Jill Hetherington defeated  Katrina Adams 6–1, 6–1
 It was Hetherington's 2nd title of the year and the 3rd of her career.

Doubles

 Patty Fendick /  Jill Hetherington defeated  Belinda Cordwell /  Julie Richardson 6–3, 6–3
 It was Fendick's 3rd title of the year and the 3rd of her career. It was Hetherington's 3rd title of the year and the 4th of her career.

See also
 1988 BP National Championships – men's tournament

References

External links
 ITF tournament edition details
 Tournament draws

Fernleaf Classic
Wellington Classic
Fern
February 1988 sports events in New Zealand